This is a list of medalists from the FIS Nordic World Ski Championships in women's cross-country skiing. Bold numbers in brackets denotes record number of victories in corresponding disciplines.

10 km
Debuted: 1954.

Classic style: 1954–1987, 1989, 2001, 2003, 2009, 2011, 2017, 2019. Free style: 1989, 1991, 2005, 2007, 2013, 2015, 2021, 2023.
Interval start: 1954–1991, 2001–2023.

Medal table

3/4 × 5 km relay
Debuted: 1954.

3×5 km classic style: 1954–1970. 4×5 km classic style: 1974–1985. 4×5 km free style: 1987. 2×5 km classic style + 2×5 km free style: 1989–2023.

Medal table

5 km (discontinued)
Debuted: 1962. Discontinued: 1999.

Classic style: 1962–1987, 1991–1999. 
Interval start: 1962–1987, 1991–1999.

Medal table

20 km and 30 km
Debuted: 1978.

Classic style: 1978–1985, 1997, 1999, 2005, 2007, 2013, 2015, 2021, 2023. Free style: 1987–1995, 2001, 2003, 2009, 2011, 2017, 2019.
Interval start: 1978–1999, 2003. Mass start: 2005–2023.

Medal table

15 km (discontinued)
Debuted: 1989. Discontinued: 2003.

Classic style: 1989–1995, 2001, 2003. Free style: 1997, 1999. 
Interval start: 1989–2001. Mass start: 2003.

Medal table

Combined/double pursuit/Skiathlon
Debuted: 1993.

Medal table

Individual sprint
Debuted: 2001.

Classic style: 2005, 2007, 2013, 2015, 2021, 2023. Free style: 2001, 2003, 2009, 2011, 2017, 2019.

Medal table

Team sprint
Debuted: 2005.

Classic style: 2009, 2011, 2017, 2019. Free style: 2005, 2007, 2013, 2015, 2021, 2023.

Medal table

Medal table
Table updated after the 2023 Championships.

Multiple medalists

Boldface denotes active cross-country skiers and highest medal count among all cross-country skiers (including these who not included in these tables) per type.

All events

Individual events

Best performers by country
Here are listed most successful cross-country skiers in the history of each medal-winning national team – according to the gold-first ranking system and by total number of World Championships medals (one skier if he holds national records in both categories or few skiers if these national records belongs to different persons). If the total number of medals is identical, the gold, silver and bronze medals are used as tie-breakers (in that order). If all numbers are the same, the skiers get the same placement and are sorted by the alphabetic order.

An asterisk (*) marks athletes who are the only representatives of their respective countries to win a medal.

Multiple medals at one championship
 5 medals:
 out of 5 possible:
      1997 Yelena Välbe 
      1989 Marjo Matikainen 
 out of 6 possible:
      2011 Marit Bjørgen 
      2013 Marit Bjørgen 
      2005 Marit Bjørgen 
      2019 Ingvild Flugstad Østberg 
 4 medals:
 out of 4 possible:
     1982 Berit Aunli 
     1985 Anette Bøe 
     1985 Grete Ingeborg Nykkelmo 
     1978 Raisa Smetanina 
 out of 5 possible:
     1995 Larisa Lazutina 
     1991 Yelena Välbe 
     2001 Olga Danilova 
     1993 Lyubov Yegorova 
     1997 Stefania Belmondo 
 out of 6 possible:
     2017 Marit Bjørgen 
     2021 Therese Johaug 
     2019 Therese Johaug 
     2007 Virpi Kuitunen 
     2009 Aino-Kaisa Saarinen 
     2013 Therese Johaug 
     2023 Ebba Andersson 
     2003 Kristina Šmigun  (all four individual)
     2005 Yuliya Chepalova 
     2015 Charlotte Kalla 
     2003 Olga Zavyalova 
     2023 Frida Karlsson 
 3 medals:
 out of 3 possible:
    1962 Alevtina Kolchina 
    1974 Galina Kulakova 
    1966 Klavdiya Boyarskikh 
    1966 Alevtina Kolchina 
    1970 Galina Kulakova 
    1962 Maria Gusakova 
 out of 4 possible:
    1978 Helena Takalo 
    1978 Zinaida Amosova 
    1987 Anfisa Reztsova 
    1978 Hilkka Riihivuori 
    1982 Hilkka Riihivuori 
 2 medals out of 2 possible:
   1954 Lyubov Kozyreva 
   1958 Alevtina Kolchina 
   1958  Lyubov Kozyreva 
   1954 Siiri Rantanen 
   1954 Mirja Hietamies 
   1958 Siiri Rantanen

See also
Cross-country skiing at the Winter Olympics
List of Olympic medalists in cross-country skiing (men)
List of Olympic medalists in cross-country skiing (women)

External links and references
https://archive.today/20120731171641/http://www.fis-ski.com/uk/majorevents/fisworldskichampionships/nordicwsc.html
https://web.archive.org/web/20050305075135/http://www.sports123.com/cco/index.html

Cross-country skiing, FIS Nordic World Ski Championships
FIS
FIS